The women's 100 metre freestyle was a swimming event held as part of the swimming at the 1912 Summer Olympics programme. It was the first appearance of a women's event in Olympic swimming, followed closely by the 4×100 metre free relay. The competition was held from Monday to Friday, 8 to 12 July 1912.

Twenty-seven swimmers from eight nations competed.

Durack also won the gold medal, with compatriot Wylie close behind for silver.

Records

These were the standing world and Olympic records (in minutes) prior to the 1912 Summer Olympics.

Belle Moore, swimming in the first heat, set the first Olympic record with 1 minute 29.8 seconds. In the second heat Daisy Curwen bettered the record with 1 minute 23.6 seconds, and in the fourth heat Fanny Durack set a new world record with 1 minute 19.8 seconds.

Results

Quarterfinals

The top two in each heat advanced along with the fastest loser overall.

Heat 1

Heat 2

Heat 3

Heat 4

Heat 5

Semifinals

The top two from each heat and the faster of the two third place swimmers advanced.

Semifinal 1

Semifinal 2

Curwen had to undergo an operation for appendicitis and missed the final. Rosenberg advanced to the final to replace her.

Final

References

Notes
 
 

Swimming at the 1912 Summer Olympics
1912 in women's swimming
Women's events at the 1912 Summer Olympics